Indian musical instruments can be broadly classified according to the Hornbostel–Sachs system into four categories: chordophones (string instruments), aerophones (wind instruments), membranophones (drums) and idiophones (non-drum percussion instruments).

Chordophones

Plucked strings

Bowed strings

 Chikara	
 Dhantara
 Dilruba
 Ektara violin	
 Esraj	
 Kamaicha
 Kingri (string instrument)	
 Mayuri Vina or Taus	
 Onavillu
 Behala (violin type)
 Pena (musical instrument)
 Pinaka vina
 Pulluvan Veena - one stringed violin	 	
 Ravanahatha
 Sarangi	
 Classical Sarangi	
 Sarinda	
 Tar Shehnai
 Villu Paatu - arched bow instrument
+ Behala - Bengal Murshidabad Violin Persian "Behaaleh" (Restless)

Other string instruments
 Gethu or Jhallari – struck tanpura
 Gubguba or Jamuku (khamak)
 Pulluvan kutam
 Santoor – Hammered dulcimer

Aerophones

Single reed
Pepa
Pungi or Been

Double reed
 Kuzhal
 Mukhavina	
 Nadaswaram
 Shehnai
 Sundari
 Tangmuri

Flute
 Alghoza – double flute
 Bansuri
 Venu (Carnatic flute) Pullanguzhal

Bagpipes
Mashak
Titti
Sruti upanga

Free reed
 Gogona	
 Morsing

Free reed and bellows
 Shruti box
 Harmonium (hand-pumped)

Brass
 Bigul – see Bugle
 Ekkalam
 Karnal
 Kombu (instrument)
 Ramsinga
 Kahal
 Nagfani
 Turi
 Tutari

Membranophones

Hand drums

Hand frame drums
 Daf, duf, or dafli – medium or large frame drum without jingles, of Persian origin
 Dubki, dimdi or dimri – small frame drum without jingles
 Kanjira – small frame drum with one jingle
 Kansi – small drum without jingles
 Patayani thappu – medium frame drum played with hands

Stick and hand drums
 Chenda
 Davul
 Dhak
 Dhimay
 Dhol
 Dholi
 Dollu
 Idakka
 Thavil
 Udukai
 Urumi (drum)

Stick drums

 Chande
 Davul
 Kachhi Dhol
 Nagara – pair of kettledrums
 Pambai – unit of two cylindrical drums
 Parai thappu, halgi – frame drum played with two sticks
 Sambal
 Stick daff or stick duff – daff in a stand played with sticks
 Tamak'
 Tasha – type of kettledrum
 Timki
 Urumee

Idiophones

 Chigggjha – fire tong with brass jingles
 Chengila – metal disc
 Eltathalam
 Gegvrer – brass vessel
 Ghaynti – Northern Indian bell
 Ghatam and Matkam (Earthenware pot drum)
 Ghunyugroo
 Khartal or Chiplya
 Manjeewera or jhanj or taal
 Nut – clay pot
 Sankarpjlnjang – lithophone
 Thali – metal plate
 Thattukanvjzhi mannai
 Yakshahgana bells

Melodic

 Jal tarang, ceramic bowls with water
 Kanch tarang, a type of glass harp
 Kashtha tarang, a type of xylophone

Hand harmonium
Dwarkanath Ghose (Dwarkin) modified the French pedal harmonium.

Electronic
 Roland HandSonic 
 Electronic tanpura
 Electronic (digital) tabla
 Talameter

See also 
 Music of India
 List of Indian dances

References 

Indian musical instruments
Musical instruments
Lists of musical instruments